Brett Carter (born March 2, 1972) was the 2010 Democratic nominee for the United States House of Representatives from Tennessee's 6th congressional district. He is an attorney at Carter Shelton, PLC, where he practices tax law with his partners, Brian Shelton and Warner Jones. He has also practiced law at Waller Lansden Dortch & Davis, LLP and Bradley Arant Boult Cummings LLP in Nashville, Tennessee. He is an Operation Iraqi Freedom veteran.

Early life, education and law career
Carter was born in Bethpage, a small community in Sumner County, Tennessee. He grew up in Gallatin and attended Gallatin High School, where he was elected student body president. Carter then attended University of Tennessee, where he was elected president of his fraternity during his sophomore year and later elected president of UT's student body of 26,000 in 1993. From there, Carter attended University of Memphis School of Law, graduating 8th in his class. He soon after married Virginia White, whom he met at the University of Tennessee, and moved to Washington, D.C. to study tax law at Georgetown University. Brett returned to Middle Tennessee in 2004. Carter currently lives in Nashville, Tennessee.  Before starting his law practice, Carter enlisted in the Tennessee Army National Guard, which ultimately led to his 18-month activation and deployment to Iraq.

2010 U.S. Congressional campaign

On June 8, 2010, Carter officially announced his campaign for Congress in Tennessee's 6th congressional district from the steps of Gallatin's city hall. His campaign focused on improving America's economic conditions, as well as bringing thoughtful, more moderate policies to the Democratic Party. After Carter won the Democratic nomination, Diane Black (R) won the general election.

References

External links
Brett R. Carter, Partner at Waller Lansden
 
Campaign contributions at OpenSecrets.org

Tennessee Democrats
Living people
1972 births